Politics of China is the politics of the People's Republic of China, a single-party socialist republic.

Politics of China may also refer to

 Politics of the Republic of China, commonly known as Taiwan
 Politics of the special administrative regions of the People's Republic of China
 Politics of Hong Kong
 Politics of Macau
Political systems of Imperial China from 221 BC to 1912 AD

See also 
 Cross-Strait relations
 History of political parties in China